Fresvikbreen is a glacier on the south side of the Sognefjord in the municipality of Vik in Vestland, county, Norway. It lies between the Seljedal valley in the west, and the Storedal valley in the east.

Fresvikbreen is the 23rd largest glacier on the Norwegian mainland.

See also
List of glaciers in Norway

References

Glaciers of Vestland
Vik